is a Japanese stage and television actor from Yokohama. His debut role was as Bunta Marui in The Prince of Tennis musical Absolute King Rikkai feat. Rokkaku ~ First Service. Kiriyama is also known for his role in Shotaro Hidari, the male lead and half of the eponymous hero of the television series Kamen Rider W.

Filmes

Filmes

TV

Stage
Musical The Prince of Tennis  – Bunta Marui
Absolute King Rikkai feat. Rokkaku ~ First Service
Dream Live 4th
Absolute King Rikkai feat. Rokkaku ~ Second Service
Dream Live 5th
 Switch wo osu toki (2007)

References

External links
Personal blog
Official profile

1985 births
Living people
Japanese male film actors
Japanese male stage actors
People from Yokohama
Japanese male television actors
21st-century Japanese male actors